Mangromedes is a genus of spiders in the family Pisauridae.

Species
, the World Spider Catalog accepted the following extant species:
Mangromedes kochi (Roewer, 1951) type species – Australia (Queensland) 
Mangromedes porosus Raven & Hebron, 2018 – Australia (Northern Territory)

References

Pisauridae
Araneomorphae genera